Xu Shilin and You Xiaodi were the defending champions, but Xu chose not to participate. You partnered Zhu Lin, but lost in the first round.

Ankita Raina and Emily Webley-Smith won the title, defeating Guo Hanyu and Jiang Xinyu in the final, 6–4, 6–4.

Seeds

Draw

References 
 Draw

Zhuhai ITF Women's Pro Circuit - Doubles
Zhuhai Open